Sanet y Negrals is a town located in the comarca of Marina Alta, in the province of Alicante, Spain.

Notable people
 Kiko Femenía, footballer

References

Municipalities in the Province of Alicante
Marina Alta